Ceylonitermes escherichi is a species of termite. It is endemic to Sri Lanka.

References

Termites
Insects of Sri Lanka
Endemic fauna of Sri Lanka
Insects described in 1911